Merílo Právednoye or Just Measure ('measure of righteousness') is an Old Russian legal collection from the late 13th or early 14th century, preserved in the copies of the 14th to the 16th centuries. The name was given in modern literature, taken from the first words of this text: "this books is just measure, true weighing..." ("siya knigi merilo pravednoye, izves istin`nyi..." or "сиѩ книги мѣрило праведноѥ. извѣсъ истиньныи..."). Just Measure was written in Old Church Slavonic and Old Russian.

Content

The Trinity (Troitsky) copy is the oldest surviving copy from the 14th century. Materials from the old legal collection from the early 12th century may have been used during the compilation of Merílo Právednoye. It was to serve both as a book of moral precepts and a legal guide book for judges as well as the transmission of several older texts. The text consists of two parts: the first contains the words and the lessons both translated and original, on the just and the unjust courts; the second part (the so-called collection of 30 chapters) consists of translations of Byzantine church and secular laws, borrowed from the Kormchaia Book, and the oldest Slavic and Russian legal texts, the Zakon Sudnyi Liudem, Vladimir's Church Statute, Russkaya Pravda, and "Legal rule on the church people" – .

Notes

Editions

 Мерило Праведное по рукописи XIV века. Издано под наблюдением и со вступительной статьей академика М. Н. Тихомирова. Изд. АН СССР. – М., 1961.

Literature

 Арсений. Описание славянских рукописей библиотеки Свято-Троицкой Сергиевой лавры // Чтения в обществе истории и древостей российских. – М., 1878.
 Бальцежак Е. Е., Николаев Г. А. О языке церковно-деловых текстов древнерусской письменности // Словобразование, Стилистика. Текст. – Казань: Изд-во Казан. ун-та, 1990.
 Бенеманский М. Ὁ Πρόχειρος Νόμος императора Василия Македонянина. Его происхождение, характеритика и значение в церковном праве. Вып. 1. – Сергиев Посад, 1906.
 Бенешевич В. Н. Древнеславянская кормчая. 14 титулов без толкований. Т. 1. Вып. 1-3. – СПб., 1906 -1907.
 Василевский В. Г. Законодательство иконоборцев // Журнал Министерства Народного Просвещения. Октябрь, 1878.
 Востоков А. Х. Описание русских и славянских рукописей Румянцевского музеума. – М., 1841.
 Данилова В. М. Палеографическое и фонетическое описание рукописи «Мерило Праведное» (Троицкое собрание, № 15). Автореф. дисс…канд.филол. наук. – М., 1969.
 Зализняк А. А. "Мерило праведное" XIV века как акцентологический источник. - Мunchen : Sagner, 1990. - 183 с. (Slavistische Beitrage ; Bd.266).
 Калачев Н. В. Исследование о Русской Правде. Ч. 1. Предварительные юридические сведения для полного объяснения Русской Правды. – М., 1846.
 Калачев Н. В. Мерило Праведное // Архив историко-юридических сведений, относящихся до России. – СПб., 1876. – Кн. 1.
 Николаев Г. А. Формы именного словообразования в языке Мерила Праведного XIV века. Автореф. дисс…канд.филол. наук. – Казань, 1966.
 Николаев Г. А. Язык церковно-деловых памятников древнерусского извода // Христианизация, дехристианизация и рехристианизация в теории и практике русского языка. Под ред. Ежи Калишана. – Познань, 2001.
 Павлов А. С. Первоначальный славяно-русский Номоканон. – Казань, 1969.
 Павлов А. С. «Книги законныя», содержащие в себе в древнерусском переводе византийские законы земледельческие, уголовные, брачные и судебные. – СПб., 1885.
 Розенкампф Г. А. Обозрение Кормчей книги в историческом виде. – СПб., 1839.
 Сперанский М. Н. Переводные сборники изречений в славяно-русской письменности. – М., 1904.
 Срезневский И. И. Обозрение древних русских списков Кормчей книги. Приложение // Сборник ОРЯС, т. 65, № 2. 1897.
 Тихомиров М. Н. Исследование о Русской Правде. Происхождение текстов. – М.;-Л., 1941.
 Тихомиров М. Н. Закон судный людем краткой редакции в русских рукописях. Вступительная статья к изданию Закона судного людем в краткой редакции. – М., 1961.
 Юшков В. С. К истории древнерусских юридических сборников (XIII в). – Саратов, 1921.
 Николаев, Геннадий. Мерило Праведное. (Заметки о составе памятника) // Православный собеседник № 1 (14) - 2007. Сайт Библиотека Якова Кротова.

See also

 Nomocanon
 Kormchaia
 Old Russian Law

Eastern Orthodoxy in medieval Russia
Christianity in the Middle East
East Slavic manuscripts
Medieval legal codes
Legal history of Russia
Legal history of Belarus
Legal history of Ukraine
Cyrillic manuscripts
Old East Slavic
13th-century neologisms
14th-century neologisms